The Novotel Plovdiv, also known as the Grand Hotel Plovdiv, is a Bulgarian five-star hotel in Plovdiv.

Description

It is located in the city's northern district, to the north of the Maritsa River and in the vicinity of the International Fair Plovdiv.

The hotel has 300 rooms and 8 luxurious flats.

The city's main street ends with the pedestrian bridge which spans the Maritsa river to the west of the hotel.

Notable events
In 2009, the hotel hosted the International Olympiad in Informatics, an annual competitive-programming competition.

See also 

 Maritsa Hotel

External links 
 Official site of the Plovdiv municipality
 Guide for Plovdiv

Year of establishment missing
Hotels in Plovdiv
Plovdiv
Hotels established in 1977
Hotel buildings completed in 1977
1977 establishments in Bulgaria